Tillandsia rubella is a species of flowering plant in the genus Tillandsia. This species is native to Bolivia, Peru, and Ecuador.

References

rubella
Flora of South America
Epiphytes
Plants described in 1888
Taxa named by John Gilbert Baker